Sport For Jove Theatre Company is an Australian theatre company. It was founded in 2008 by Damien Ryan (actor/director) and Terry Karabelas (actor/director). The company stages the works of William Shakespeare, other classical and new Australian writers.

Outdoor festivals

 Shakespeare in the Rose Garden
The Shakespeare in the Rose Garden Festival was the first Outdoor Festival set up by Sport For Jove Theatre Company in 2009 and was the brainchild of Damien and Bernadette Ryan. The Festival was renamed The Sydney Hills Shakespeare in 2010.

 The Sydney Hills Shakespeare in the Park
The Sydney Hills Shakespeare in the Park is an outdoor Shakespeare Festival based in the Hills Shire District.

Following Shakespeare in the Rose Garden's A Midsummer Night's Dream in 2009, Sport For Jove Theatre Company and the Hills Shire Council presented a new annual program for 2010 at Bella Vista Farm.

The Sydney Hills Shakespeare in the Park at the Bella Vista Farm premiered in December 2010 with Sport for Jove Theatre Company performing a repertory season of two Shakespeare plays, Romeo and Juliet & As You Like It.

 The Leura Shakespeare Festival
The Leura Shakespeare Festival is an outdoor Shakespeare Festival created by Sport For Jove Theatre Company and supported by the National Trust.

The festival has performed works in two different locations The Leura Everglades and The Norman Lindsay Gallery.

 The Sydney Morning Herald Autumn Festival of Arts Shakespeare in the Garden
The outdoor festival in the Royal Botanic Gardens, Sydney had its inaugural season in 2011. Sport For Jove Theatre Company partnered with The Royal Botanic Gardens and Domain Trust and sponsored by The Sydney Morning Herald Autumn Festival of Arts performed two plays: A Midsummer Night's Dream and As You Like it in the month of March. The Festival also included a Director's talk by director Damien Ryan.

Seasons

2008
 A Midsummer Night's Dream directed by Damien Ryan and Terry Karabelas

2009/2010
Shakespeare in the Rose Garden
 A Midsummer Night's Dream directed by Damien Ryan and Terry Karabelas

The Leura Shakespeare Festival
 A Midsummer Night's Dream directed by Damien Ryan and Terry Karabelas
 Romeo and Juliet directed by Damien Ryan and starring Michael Sheasby and Eloise Winestock

2010/2011
The Sydney Hill's Shakespeare Festival
 Romeo and Juliet directed by Damien Ryan and starring Damien Strouthos and Eloise Winestock
 As You Like It directed by Damien Ryan and starring Lizzie Schebesta and Christopher Stalley

The Leura Shakespeare Festival
 A Midsummer Night's Dream directed by Damien Ryan and Terry Karabelas
 Romeo and Juliet directed by Damien Ryan and starring Damien Strouthos and Eloise Winestock
 As You Like It directed by Damien Ryan and starring Lizzie Schebesta and Christopher Stalley

2011
The Sydney Morning Herald Autumn of the Arts Shakespeare in the Park
 A Midsummer Night's Dream, directed by Damien Ryan and Terry Karabelas
 As You Like It, directed by Damien Ryan and starring Lizzie Schebesta and Christopher Stalley
The Libertine (Thomas Shadwell, 1676), directed by Damien Ryan and Terry Karabelas

Education
''Sport for Jove Theatre Company is currently developing its education program Y Shakespeare.

Critical reception
 Sydney Morning Herald Review of As You Like It
 Sydney Arts Guide Review

References

External links
 Sport For Jove Theatre Company
 Sport For Jove Facebook Page

Theatre companies in Australia
Shakespearean theatre companies
Theatre in Sydney